Jaunt may refer to:

Jaunt VR, a virtual reality company
Teleportation, called jaunting in 
Alfred Bester's The Stars My Destination (the origin of the term "to jaunte")
The Jaunt, a Stephen King story
the TV series The Tomorrow People

See also
Jaunting car